Albert Paine Ward (9 November 1896 – 5 March 1979) was an English first-class cricketer. Ward was a right-handed batsman who bowled right-arm fast.

Ward represented Hampshire in one first-class match in 1921 against Lancashire at the County Ground, Southampton. Ward scored eleven runs and took a single wicket, that of England batsman Charles Hallows.

Ward died in Jersey in the Channel Islands on 5 March 1979.

External links
Albert Ward at Cricinfo
Albert Ward at CricketArchive

1896 births
1979 deaths
People from Highgate
English cricketers
Hampshire cricketers